Daniel Ferdinand Ludwig Haberkorn (born 2 September 1811 in Kamenz - 6 April 1901 in Zittau) was a German conservative politician. He was a member of the Saxon State Parliament and long-time President of the II. Chamber.

References

1811 births
1901 deaths
People from Kamenz
Members of the Reichstag of the North German Confederation